DeMarcus or Demarcus is a masculine given name.

Notable people with the name include

Demarcus Ayers (born 1994), American football player
Demarcus Christmas (born 1995), American football player
DeMarcus Corley (born 1974), American boxer
DeMarcus Cousins (born 1990), American basketball player
DeMarcus Covington (born 1989), American football coach
DeMarcus Curry (born 1975), American football player
Demarcus Dobbs (born 1987), American football player
Demarcus Evans (born 1996), American baseball player
DeMarcus Faggins (born 1979), American football player
DaMarcus Fields (born 1998), American football player
DeMarcus Granger (born 1986), American football player
DeMarcus Lawrence (born 1992), American football player
DeMarcus Love (born 1988), American football player
DaMarcus Mitchell (born 1998), American football player
DeMarcus Nelson (born 1985), American basketball player
Demarcus Robinson (born 1994), American football player
DeMarcus Van Dyke (born 1989), American football player
DeMarcus Walker (born 1994), American football player
DeMarcus Ware (born 1982), American football player

See also
Jamarcus, a page for people with the given name "Jamarcus"

English-language masculine given names